WZOZ (103.1 FM) is an American local radio station broadcasting a classic hits format.  Licensed to Oneonta, New York, the station is currently owned by Townsquare Media.

References

External links

ZOZ
Townsquare Media radio stations